is the debut single by Japanese singer/songwriter Mari Hamada, from the album of the same title. Written by Hamada, Hiroaki Matsuzawa, and Yōgo Kōno, the single was released by Invitation on October 21, 1985 to commercial success and positive reviews. Since its release, the song has been a regular staple on Hamada's live set list. The single peaked at No. 42 on Oricon's singles chart.

Track listing

Chart positions

References

External links 
 
 

1985 songs
1985 debut singles
Japanese-language songs
Mari Hamada songs
Victor Entertainment singles